Diana Louisa Napolis (born 1955), also known by her online pseudonym Karen Curio Jones or more often simply Curio, is an American former social worker. Between the late 1990s and 2000, Napolis posted a series of pseudonymous accusations alleging that individuals skeptical of the satanic ritual abuse moral panic were involved in a conspiracy to cover up the sexual abuse and murder of children. The pseudonymous poster's real life identity was confirmed as Napolis in 2000.

In 2001, she was charged with stalking film director Steven Spielberg, and in 2002 faced more charges for making death threats against actress Jennifer Love Hewitt, and was committed to a state hospital until fit to stand trial. After a year in prison Napolis pleaded guilty to stalking and was released on probation.

Satanic ritual abuse allegations
Napolis originally worked as a child protection worker for nearly 10 years (leaving the position in 1996), becoming involved in the satanic ritual abuse (SRA) moral panic that arose in the early 1980s. By the late 1990s the phenomenon was rejected by mainstream scholars and law enforcement experts, but Napolis continued to believe in the existence of SRA. Napolis held that those who had discredited the phenomenon were themselves child abusers involved in a conspiracy to conceal their activities from the public.

Posting under the screen name "Curio", Napolis began a pattern of online harassment against those she believed were involved in the conspiracy, posting information about the individuals. Among those she targeted were Carol Hopkins, a school administrator who was part of a grand jury in San Diego, California that criticized social workers for removing children from their home without reason; Michael Aquino, a member of the Temple of Set and a lieutenant colonel in the United States Army Reserve against whom accusations of SRA were made but dropped as the accusations proved to be impossible; and Elizabeth Loftus, a professor who studied memory who believed coercive questioning techniques by poorly trained investigators led to young children making false allegations of child sexual abuse. Loftus was confronted at a New Zealand academic conference by a group of people who accused her of conspiring to help child molesters, with information consisting largely of the postings made by Napolis. Napolis's actions against Aquino also led to the first ever lawsuit in the state of California that attempted to place responsibility for a Usenet poster's actions on their internet service provider, and one of the first to be filed under the United States Communications Decency Act.

Using public computers in internet cafes and libraries, Napolis concealed her identity for five years while continuing to post information online about those she believed were involved in the conspiracy. In 2000, private researcher Michelle Devereaux and the San Diego State University police tracked Napolis and caught her in the act of posting information as Curio online from a campus lab. No charges were filed, but by revealing her identity, those Napolis had harassed ceased to consider her a serious threat. The story was reported in The San Diego Union-Tribune, which was added to her online list of harassing parties.

Celebrity harassment

Steven Spielberg
In the fall of 2001, Steven Spielberg filed a restraining order against Napolis after she made harassing telephone calls to him. Napolis claimed Spielberg and his wife were part of a satanic cult operating out of his basement that had implanted a microchip called "soulcatcher" in her brain, an accusation to which Spielberg replied "To state the obvious, I am not involved with any form of manipulating Ms. Napolis' mind or body through remote technology or otherwise." Spielberg also expressed concern for the safety and security of his family. His security team indicated they believed Napolis to be suffering from a delusional disorder and posed "a serious risk of violent confrontation". The judge ruled Napolis was barred from approaching within 150 meters of Spielberg and believed her to be a "credible threat" to the director.

Jennifer Love Hewitt
On September 18, 2002, Napolis "verbally confronted" Jennifer Love Hewitt while entering the 2002 Grammy Awards, and on the next day attempted to pose as a friend of the actress to enter the premiere of The Tuxedo. On October 10 Napolis again tried to confront Hewitt at a filming, and emailed several death threats to the actress later that month. In December 2002, Napolis was arrested for stalking and making death threats against Hewitt, charged with six felonies, and remanded to San Diego County Jail on $500,000 bail. At her hearing, Napolis also admitted to becoming involved in a shoving match with Hewitt's mother while confronting the actress. Napolis accused the actress and Spielberg of being part of a satanic conspiracy and using mind controlling "cybertronic" technology to manipulate her body. Napolis was committed to Patton State Hospital in 2003 for three years or until fit to stand trial.

After nearly a year in jail, including five months in a state psychiatric facility where she was judged delusional but fit to stand trial, Napolis pleaded guilty to stalking on September 29, 2003, receiving five years probation; in addition, she was required to enroll in a counseling program, surrender all firearms and other weapons, abstain from drugs and alcohol and refrain from using computers. Napolis was also barred from any contact with Spielberg, Hewitt and their families for 10 years and was required by the judge to continue taking prescribed medication.

References

External links
 Statement by Napolis in People v. Napolis
 Michael Aquino response in Napolis v. Aquino et al. (2008)

1955 births
American social workers
Date of birth missing (living people)
Day care sexual abuse allegations in the United States
Living people
People convicted of stalking
People from La Mesa, California
Satanic ritual abuse hysteria in the United States
Social workers
American conspiracy theorists